Last One on Earth is the second album by Asphyx. It was released in 1992 by Century Media Records.

Martin van Drunen recorded the vocals alone in the studio without realizing he was already booted from the band. The vocals were intended to be recorded by Ron van Pol however the other members of Asphyx thought the vocal tracks were fine with Martin singing so they were kept and the lyrics to be sung by van Pol were yet to be written so van Drunen's lyrics were kept as well.

Track listing

Personnel
Asphyx
Martin van Drunen - vocals
Ron van Pol - bass guitar
Eric Daniels - guitar
Bob Bagchus - drums

Production
Harry Wijering - Engineering, Producer
Stefanie Esser	- Photography
Claus C. Pilz - Layout
Axel Hermann - Cover art

References

Asphyx albums
1992 albums
Century Media Records albums